Álvaro Nicolás Brun Martínez (born 10 April 1987) is a Uruguayan footballer who plays as a midfielder for Montevideo City Torque.

Career

Brun started his career with Uruguayan top flight side Fénix, before joining San Martín de Tucumán in the Argentine third division.

In 2013, Brun signed for Argentine club Gimnasia y Esgrima de Jujuy, where he made 34 league appearances and scored 0 goals.

In 2015, he signed for Real Estelí in Nicaragua after playing for Uruguayan top flight team Cerro.

Before the second half of 2015/16, Brun signed for Oriental in the Uruguayan second division.

References

External links
 
 

1987 births
Living people
Uruguayan people of French descent
Uruguayan footballers
Uruguayan expatriate footballers
Association football midfielders
Montevideo City Torque players
Uruguayan Primera División players
Uruguayan Segunda División players
Centro Atlético Fénix players
Nicaraguan Primera División players
Primera Nacional players
Cerro Largo F.C. players
Gimnasia y Esgrima de Jujuy footballers
C.A. Cerro players
Real Estelí F.C. players
Central Español players
Universidad de Chile footballers
Uruguayan expatriate sportspeople in Chile
Uruguayan expatriate sportspeople in Argentina
Uruguayan expatriate sportspeople in Nicaragua
Expatriate footballers in Chile
Expatriate footballers in Argentina
Expatriate footballers in Nicaragua
Footballers from Montevideo